Country Code: +242
International Call Prefix: 00
Trunk Prefix: 0

Calling formats
To call in the Republic of the Congo, the following format is used:
 yy zz xxxxx Calls within Republic of the Congo
 +242 yy zz xxxxx Calls from outside Republic of the Congo
The NSN length is nine digits.

List of area codes in the Republic of the Congo

References

Congo, Republic of the
Telecommunications in the Republic of the Congo
Telephone numbers